Juan Pablo Mbela Roku (born 5 August 1982) is an Equatoguinean former professional football who played as a striker.

Club career
Mbela was born in Malabo, Equatorial Guinea. He was formed as footballer at RC Strasbourg. Between 2000 and 2008, he played for French lower-league clubs: ASM Vénissieux, SR Colmar, Gap HAFC and Rhône-Crussol.

In January 2009, Mbela tried in the Italian Third Division side Crotone, but returned to France the following month.

In 2012 he played for CO Saint-Pierre in the second division of Réunion.

International career
Discovered and called by Vicente Engonga, Mbela played for Equatorial Guinea national team in two World Cup 2010 Qualifying matches, against Sierra Leone (in Freetown, Sierra Leone) and South Africa (in Malabo). In 2009 he also featured in a friendly match against Ivory Coast and in August 2010 against Morocco.

References

External links

1982 births
Living people
Sportspeople from Malabo
Equatoguinean footballers
Association football forwards
Gap HAFC players
SR Colmar players
AS Saint-Priest players
ASM Vénissieux players
Le Puy Foot 43 Auvergne players
Ain Sud players
Equatorial Guinea international footballers
Equatoguinean expatriate footballers
Equatoguinean expatriate sportspeople in France
Expatriate footballers in France
Equatoguinean expatriate sportspeople in Réunion
Expatriate footballers in Réunion